Coria is a Spanish municipality in the province of Cáceres, Extremadura, formed by the city of the same name and the towns of Puebla de Argeme and Rincón del Obispo. The whole municipality has 12,531 inhabitants and a population density of 120 inhabitants/km, which makes this city the capital of Vegas de Alagón and the fourth largest city in the province of Cáceres.

The largest municipality in the northwest of the province, Coria preserves several monuments and holds an annual national tourist interest festival in honor of San Juan.

History
Founded before the Romans occupied the Iberian Peninsula, and called Caura, the Romans gave it its present name in Latin, Caurium, and later the city was granted Roman citizenship. Later under the Visigoths, the Diocese of Coria was created and, except for the years of Muslim rule, held at the Episcopal Coria until the twentieth century, when it was forced to share the capital of the diocese in Cáceres.

The centuries in which Coria was the only capital of the diocese were of great prosperity for the city.

Coria was taken twice during the Reconquista, firstly after 1085. It was conquered by the Almoravids just after 1109 and unsuccessfully besieged in 1138. A successful Christian conquest followed after a two-month siege in 1142, after which the diocese was restored. In 1174, the place was taken over by the troops of Almohad general Abu Hafs, returning to Christian rule after 1184. While it is understood the place should have already enjoyed its own fuero by the early 13th-century, the first evidence about the existence of a local fuero (presumably modelled after the second fuero of Ciudad Rodrigo) traces back to 1227.

Coria became the capital of a lordship to which some towns are still named after, such as Guijo de Coria or Casillas de Coria. After the dissolution, Coria became the judicial capital of Coria.

Sights
Roman walls (3rd-4th centuries AD)
Cathedral of Santa María de la Asunción, in transitional Gothic style
Bishop's palace (1628)
Castle of Coria (1472-1478)
Baroque Hermitage of Nuestra Señora de Argeme (17th century)
Royal Prisons (1686)
Old Bridge (Puente Viejo), dating to the 15th-16th centuries
Convent of the Madre de Dios, founded in the 13th century. The current structure dates to the 14th-16th centuries
Church of Santiago, in Baroque style (16th-18th centuries)
Palaces of the Dukes of Alba (15th-16th centuries)

See also
Roman Catholic Diocese of Coria-Cáceres

References

Municipalities in the Province of Cáceres